Attygalle is a Sinhalese surname.

Notable people
 Athula Attygalle (born 1950), Sri Lankan scientist
 C. E. Attygalle (1905–1980), Ceylonese politician
 Dhanapala Attygalle, Sri Lankan politician
 Dharmasena Attygalle (1925–1989), Sri Lankan politician
 Don Charles Gemoris Attygalle (1836–1901), Ceylonese businessman
 John Attygalle (1906–1981), Ceylonese police officer
 Nicholas Attygalle (1894–1970), Ceylonese academic
 Sepala Attygalle (1921–2001), Ceylonese army officer

See also
 
 Attygalle murder

Sinhalese surnames